The Manipur football team is an Indian football team representing Manipur in Indian state football competitions including the Santosh Trophy.

They have appeared in the Santosh Trophy finals twice, and have won the trophy once, in 2002-03.

Squad
The following 22 players were called for the 2022–23 Santosh Trophy.

Team officials 
Team Manager:
Team Coach: Gift Raikhan (2022)

Honours

State
 Santosh Trophy
 Winners (1): 2002–03
 Runners-up (1): 2010–11
 B.C. Roy Trophy
 Winners (2): 1998–99, 1999–2000
 Runners-up (4): 1991–92, 2000–01, 2004–05, 2008–09
 Mir Iqbal Hussain Trophy
 Winners (1): 1978–79
 Runners-up (2): 1986–87, 2003–04
 M. Dutta Ray Trophy
 Winners (1): 1994

Others
 Churachand Singh Trophy
 Winners (1): 1954
 Runners-up (2): 1950, 1952
 Kohima Royal Gold Cup
 Winners (1): 1998

References

1973 establishments in Manipur
Santosh Trophy teams
Association football clubs established in 1973